Nedelja na Duhove (trans. Pentecost Sunday) is the only album by Serbian rock supergroup Dobrovoljno Pevačko Društvo.

History 
The band went to Budapest and recorded the album in the Utopia Studio during January and February 1995. The band recorded with Hungarian musicians Zoltan Metenyi (drums), Istvan Steve Alapi (guitar) and guest musicians from famous Serbian bands - Nenad Stefanović Japanac (bass and guitar), Milan Đurđević (keyboards) and Aleksandra and Kristina Kovač who did the backing vocals.

The CD was released through Eastfield music in 1995. Two promotional videos were recorded, for tracks "Čekaj me" ("Wait For Me"), for which Nebojša Krstić provided vocals, and "Zemlja" ("Earth"), sung by Srđan Šaper. Krstić also provided vocals for "Kratko pismo (za dugo rastajanje)" and "Nedelja na Duhove". Besides "Zemlja", Šaper did the vocals on "Arcadia", "Laura" (with lyrics in English language) and both "Sestrice mala" and "Little Sister", two versions of the same song, in Serbian and English, respectively. Kiki Lesendrić was the record producer and arranger and provided vocals for "Mala pesma" and "Ako prestanem da te volim".

Even though the album was commercially successful, the band did not last.

Track listing 
All tracks by Nebojša Krstić, Srđan Šaper and Zoran Lesendrić Kiki.

 "Čekaj me" (4:19)
 "Sestrice mala" (4:17)
 "Arcadia" (4:13)
 "Kratko pismo (za dugo rastajanje)" (4:34)
 "Mala pesma" (2:38)
 "Laura" (5:01)
 "Zemlja" (4:33)
 "Ako prestanem da te volim" (5:24)
 "Nedelja na Duhove" (4:06)
 "Little Sister" (4:33)

Personnel 

 Nebojša Krstić - vocals 
 Srđan Šaper - vocals 
 Zoran Kiki Lesendrić - guitar

External links 
 EX YU ROCK enciklopedija 1960-2006,  Janjatović Petar;  
Review by Petar Lukovic, Vreme zabave 1995
 

Dobrovoljno Pevačko Društvo albums
1995 debut albums